Brachyta punctata is the species of the Lepturinae subfamily in long-horned beetle family. This beetle is distributed in China, Mongolia, and Russia.

References

Lepturinae
Beetles described in 1833